Novotokranovo (Yañı Tuqran) is a rural locality (a village) in Kaltasinsky Selsoviet, Kaltasinsky District, Bashkortostan, Russia. The population was 43 as of 2010. There are 2 streets.

Geography 
Novotokranovo is located 3 km south of Kaltasy (the district's administrative centre) by road.

References 

Rural localities in Kaltasinsky District